Whiteburn Mines is a community in the Canadian province of Nova Scotia, located in the Region of Queens Municipality.

Communities in the Region of Queens Municipality
General Service Areas in Nova Scotia